Murder at Honeymoon Hotel is a 2016 Chinese-South Korean suspense drama film directed by Jang Cheol-soo, 李光浩 and 千丙哲 and starring Zhang Jingchu, Peter Ho, Kim Young-min, Ni Hongjie and Goh-Wee Ping. It was released in China by Shanghai Yinrun Advertising Media and Haining Yinrun Pictures on May 27, 2016.

Plot
A young girl by the name of Feifei was being taunted how she looked by an actress named Per'er. So Feifei decided to get plastic surgery to look exactly like Per'er kill her and go after Per'er's boyfriend Kai Bin.

Cast
Zhang Jingchu
Peter Ho
Kim Young-min
Ni Hongjie
Goh-Wee Ping
Wen Xiang

Reception
The film has grossed  at the Chinese box office.

References

South Korean drama films
Chinese suspense films
Films directed by Jang Cheol-soo
2016 drama films
2010s South Korean films